The Texas Open Finswimming Invitational is an open finswimming competition held in Texas since 1999. The event is sanctioned by the Texas Finswimming Association (TFA) and is open to all finswimmers who are registered competitors of the TFA and invited finswimmers from other states and countries. Events are contested for both males and females, with no distinction between the various age groups competing. The meet is conducted in an open format.

The meet has been hosted by the Finswimming Association of Southeast Texas, Sam Rayburn High School aquatics team and  Pasadena High School aquatics team

The meet was first contested in 1999 and was not held from 2008 to 2010 due to weather and the lack of a suitable pool. The 2011 event was held at San Jacinto College and was contested with local high school finswimmers who had ties to local teams.

Texas Open Finswimming Invitational Records

Short course yards

Men 

The records listed are correct as of March 31, 2011.

Women

See also

References

External links
 Texas Finswimming Association
 Texas Finswimming Association (archive site)
 Underwater Society of America

Sports competitions in Texas
Finswimming competitions